There are many Prince Charlies Caves in the Highlands, caves where Charles Edward Stuart was said to have sheltered when on the run from the Duke of Cumberland, after the defeat at the Battle of Culloden.
There is one such cave supposedly located on Meilchan, a small green hillock, overlooking Loch nan Uamh in Druimindarroch in Inverness-shire, Scotland. However, there have  been many other possible locations suggested. Another cave which Bonnie Prince Charlie stayed in with Ewen MacPherson of Cluny for two weeks in September of 1746 before his final departure for France on 20 September  was located around Ben Alder, for which several actual locations have been suggested. There are at least two such caves in South Uist, in Gleann Corghadail and to the north of Beinn Ruigh Choinnich, with a third possible in Èiseabhal.

Gallery

References

Landforms of Highland (council area)
Charles Edward Stuart
Caves of Scotland